Tobias Kroner (born 16 October 1985) is a former motorcycle speedway rider from Germany.

Speedway career

Kroner began his British league career after he signed for Oxford for the 2005 Elite League speedway season. He struggled during the season but switched to Ipswich Witches the following season where his form began to improve.

In 2007, he remained with Ipswich and made his Polish league debut for Orzeł Łódź in the Polish Speedway First League. He then joined  Wybrzeże Gdańsk, with whom he reached the Ekstraliga.

After four seasons with Ipswich he would have one more season in Britain riding for the Belle Vue Aces during the 2010 Elite League speedway season. He continued to ride in Poland, racing for Ostrów Wielkopolski and Wanda Kraków.

In 2012, Kroner became the champion of Germany after winning the German Individual Speedway Championship.

References 

1985 births
Living people
German speedway riders
Belle Vue Aces riders
Ipswich Witches riders
Oxford Cheetahs riders